Rafael Gutiérrez Caro (Carmona, 1912 – Alcalá de Henares, 1940) was an Andalusian anarchist militant.

Biography 
Originally from Carmona, he was a peasant by profession and from his youth he was an anarchist. He became a military officer in the National Confederation of Labor (CNT) .

After the outbreak of the Spanish Civil War he joined the confederal militias, coming to fight in the Sierra Morena area, integrated into the Andalusia-Extremadura Column. In March 1937 he was appointed commander of the 70th Mixed Brigade, at the head of which would take part in the Battle of Guadalajara. Later he commanded the 14th Division, formed mainly by anarcho-syndicalists. In March 1939, during the Casado coup, he positioned himself in favor of the National Defence Council. He was taken prisoner by the nationalists at the end of the war, he was court-martialed, sentenced to death, and executed in Alcalá de Henares on 3 June 1940.

References

Bibliography
 
 
 

1912 births
1940 deaths
Confederación Nacional del Trabajo members
Spanish military personnel of the Spanish Civil War (Republican faction)
People executed by Francoist Spain
People from Andalusia
Spanish anarchists
Executed anarchists